Busan IPark is a South Korean professional football club based in Busan that competes in K League 2, the second tier of the South Korean football pyramid. They play their home games at Busan Gudeok Stadium.

The club was one of the original five founding members of the K League and continuously competed in the first division from 1983 to 2015, when they were relegated for the first time. Initially, the club was called Daewoo Royals, in reference to the motor company that originally owned and financed it. Since the mid-1990s, Busan has actually received financial backing from the HDC Group and its apartment brand IPARK, rebranding as Busan i.cons, and then as Busan IPark in the process.

History

Daewoo Royals

After being at the top of the league for most of the 1983 season, Daewoo finished second in its league debut conceding the title to Hallelujah FC by a single point after a goalless draw against Yukong Elephants in the Masan Series. In its sophomore season, the club turned professional, renamed itself as Daewoo Royals, and clinched its first league title after defeating Yukong Elephants by an aggregate score of 2–1 in the 1984 K-League Championship playoff. The Royals reached the playoff after winning the second round of a league which now included the likes of Lucky-Goldstar Hwangso and Hyundai Horang-i.

Daewoo Royals headed into 1986 K-League season as continental champions after clinching the 1985–86 Asian Club Championship, becoming the first South Korean side to accomplish this feat after defeating Al-Ahli 3–1 in extra time in Jeddah, Saudi Arabia. Despite continental success, the team suffered a dismal season and failed to reach the 1986 K-League Championship playoff after finishing fourth in the first round of the league and third in the second.

The Royals clinched their second league title after finishing at the top of the league with 46 points in the 1987 season. The Royals recaptured the league title in 1991 (making it their third) finishing ten points ahead of their closest competitor that season, Hyundai Horang-i. The Royals' momentum did not last as the club struggled in the ensuing seasons finishing at or near the bottom of the league.

Pusan Daewoo Royals

At the end of 1995 season, K-League sides began the process of "localizing", and the club became known as Pusan Daewoo Royals in reference to its city of residence. In 1997, Pusan Daewoo Royals lifted its fourth league title, becoming the first team to have won the K-League Championship four times. The Royals were also the first team to have won the league twice (in 1987) and thrice (in 1991).

Although the 1998 season marked the emergence of a forward Ahn Jung-hwan, the Royals finished mid-table. The club did however manage to qualify for the 1999 K-League Championship playoffs after placing fourth in regular season. During the playoffs, the Royals managed to knock out Chunnam Dragons and Bucheon SK to secure the right to face defending champions, Suwon Samsung Bluewings, a club which was at the pinnacle of its rise.

Busan i.cons

As a company-owned club, the Royals' success was invariably linked to the health and success of its owner, Daewoo corporation. In the late 1990s, the company began to suffer from major financial difficulties and parted ways with its once successful sports franchise. IPark Construction, the domestic construction division of Hyundai, secured ownership of the club acquiring all its past history and records. The new owners not only renamed the club as Busan i.cons ("con's" refers to construction), but also changed the club's home colors from blue to red and moved it from Busan Gudeok Stadium to Busan Asiad Stadium.

Under new ownership, the club seldom challenged for the title finishing mid-table or toward the bottom of the league in the 2000s. Aside from winning the FA Cup for the first time in the club's history in 2004 under the guidance of Scottish manager Ian Porterfield (defeating Bucheon SK in a penalty shootout), the trophy cabinet remained largely empty.

Busan IPark

On the onset of the 2005 season, the owners changed the club's name to Busan I'Park (currently Busan IPark). After winning the first round, Porterfield's Busan side reached the 2005 K-League Championship play-offs, but lost to a traditionally lightweight, but then-inspired Incheon United side led by Chang Woe-ryong.

For the 2008 season, Hwang Sun-hong took over as manager. Although Busan did not win any silverware during his tenure, he did manage to bring in players such as Kim Chang-soo, Jeong Shung-hoon, Yang Dong-hyun and Kim Geun-chul while injecting the team with much needed youth by giving prospects such as Han Sang-woon, Park Hee-do, and Park Jong-woo first team opportunities. In his final season in charge of Busan, Hwang managed to lead his side to the 2010 Korean FA Cup Final.

For the 2011 season, the board appointed An Ik-soo to take over from Hwang Sun-Hong who had left to manage his former club, Pohang Steelers. Under An, Busan managed to reach the playoffs for the first time since 2005 after finishing fifth on the league table in the regular season. An's Busan side was knocked out in the first round of the play-offs by Suwon Samsung Bluewings by a familiar scoreline of 1–0.

In February 2012, an adjustment was made to the club's name by dropping an apostrophe making the official name read Busan IPark.

In 2015, after 9 successive bottom-half finishes, Busan IPark were relegated to the K League Challenge for the first time in their history.

Towards the end of the 2016 season, with an immediate return to the K League Classic looking unlikely, IPark moved back to their smaller, previous home ground, the Gudeok Stadium.

Busan IPark had an impressive 2017 season, although this was overshadowed by the death of then-manager Cho Jin-ho with only two weeks remaining in the season. Busan finished runners up in the K League Challenge to Gyeongnam FC, losing only 6 games all season. With caretaker manager, Lee Seung-yub in charge, Busan defeated Asan Mugunghwa FC, in the playoff semi-final, but lost on penalties after a two-legged final to Sangju Sangmu FC, who became the first K League Classic team to retain their league status via the playoffs. Busan also reached the final of the FA Cup, knocking out higher league opposition in Pohang Steelers, FC Seoul, Jeonnam Dragons and Suwon Bluewings but once again lost over a two-legged final, this time to Ulsan Hyundai.

For the 2018 season in the newly re-branded K League 2, Choi Yun-kyum was appointed manager after previously gaining promotion with Gangwon FC. Busan IPark eventually finished third in the K League 2, but for the second consecutive season lost in the two-legged playoff final, this time to FC Seoul. Despite again failing in their promotion bid, Busan broke numerous attendance records for the K League 2, including over 10,000 for the home leg of the playoff final. After failing to get promoted, manager Choi Yun-kyum resigned in the off-season and was replaced by Cho Deok-je. Busan enjoyed a successful 2019 season, with Cho Deok-je implementing an attacking brand of football that saw Busan finish as the top-scoring team in the division. Cho's side were built around young talents such as Kim Moon-hwan, Lee Dong-jun, and Kim Jin-kyu, as well as then national team striker Lee Jung-hyup, veteran midfielder Park Jong-woo, and Brazilian playmaker Rômulo. Busan IPark finished second in the K League 2 behind Gwangju FC, entering the promotion playoffs for the fourth season in a row. After defeating FC Anyang 1–0 at home, Busan faced local rivals Gyeongnam FC in a two-legged final. After a goalless first leg at the Gudeok Stadium, Busan won the away fixture 2–0 to secure their return to Korea's top division for the first time since 2015.

The 2020 season brought quite the opposite feelings, in comparison: the club quickly found itself fighting against relegation, and coach Cho Deok-je eventually left the club in September after a poor run of results. Former Incheon United coach Lee Ki-hyung took over in a caretaker capacity for the remaining four games of the season. After taking four points from his first two games in charge, Busan only needed a single point from either of their final games of the season to guarantee their top flight status for another year. However, despite leading at half-time against both Incheon United and Seongnam FC, Busan lost both games and finished in last place, thus getting relegated back to the K League 2. 

Because of this major blow, at the start of 2021 Busan's board chose to pursue a general rebuild, which was opened by massive changes in the locker room: a multi-phased trade with Ulsan Hyundai saw Lee Kyu-seong and homegrown rising star Lee Dong-jun depart, in favour of Choi Jun, Park Jeong-in, Lee Sang-heon and Jung Hoon-sung; other prominent players, including Han Ji-ho (who went to Bucheon FC 1995), Kang Min-soo (to Incheon United), Rômulo (to Chengdu), Kim Moon-hwan (who joined MLS club Los Angeles FC) and Kwon Hyeok-kyu (due to military service at Gimcheon Sangmu), left the club as well; the previous year's top scorer and MVP, An Byong-jun, as well as Ahn Joon-soo, Park Min-gyu (on loan), Valentinos Sielis, Domagoj Drožđek and Ryan Edwards, were all brought in. 

The team also had its first permanent foreign manager since 2007, as newcomer Ricardo Peres was appointed, following a conversation between the board and then South Korean national team head coach Paulo Bento, who Peres had worked with for years. Although the young Portuguese manager succeeded in implementing new training strategies at the club and giving young players more chances, he had a controversial relationship with supporters, while the team's results were panned by inconsistency and lack of balance: having the worst defence of the league (with 56 conceded goals) and relying mainly on two players for goals (An Byong-jun and Park Jeong-in), Busan finished fifth in the league and out of the promotion play-offs. Nevertheless, new positives were still taken as backbone player Kim Jin-kyu established himself as one of the best midfielders of the season, while Choi Jun and An Byong-jun were nominated in the league's Best XI, as the latter also won both his second Top Scorer and MVP awards in a row.

Club name history

Current squad

Out on loan

Retired number(s)

12 — Club supporters (the 12th man)
16 —  Kim Joo-sung, 1987–1999 (winger, attacking midfielder, centre-back)

Kits

Kit suppliers
 1983–1992: Adidas
 1993–1995: Erima
 1996–1998: Adidas
 1999: Fila
 2000–2003: Nike
 2004: Kappa
 2005–2006: Hummel
 2007–2011: Fila
 2012–2013: Puma
 2014–2021: Adidas
2022–present: Puma

Honours

Domestic

League
 K League 1
Winners (4): 1984, 1987, 1991, 1997
Runners-up (3): 1983, 1990, 1999

K League 2
Runners-up (2): 2017, 2019

 Korean National Semi-Professional Football League
Winners (1): 1981 Spring

Cups
 Korean FA Cup
Winners (1): 2004
Runners-up (2): 2010, 2017
 Korean League Cup
Winners (3): 1997, 1997s, 1998s
Runners-up (5): 1986, 1999s, 2001, 2009, 2011
 Korean National Football Championship
Winners (2): 1989, 1990
Runners-up (1): 1988
 Korean President's Cup
Runners-up (1): 1981

International

Continental
 Asian Club Championship
Winners (1): 1985–86

Worldwide
 Afro-Asian Club Championship
Winners (1): 1986

Season-by-season records

Key
W = Winners
RU = Runners-up
SF = Semi-final
QF = Quarter-final
Ro16 = Round of 16
Ro32 = Round of 32
GS = Group stage
PR = Preliminary round
3R = Third round

AFC Champions League record
All results list Busan's goal tally first.

Managerial history

References

External links

 Official website 

 
Association football clubs established in 1983
K League 1 clubs
Sport in Busan
1983 establishments in South Korea
K League 2 clubs
Works association football clubs in South Korea
AFC Champions League winning clubs